Rosemary Foot is the name of:

 Rosemary Foot (politician) (born 1936), former member of the New South Wales Legislative Assembly
 Rosemary Foot (academic), academic writer